The Great Escape is the fourth studio album of singer songwriter Ilse DeLange. The album debuted at number 1 in the Megacharts Album Top 100 in the Netherlands and stayed there for seven weeks.

Track listing
 Reach For The Light - 04:35
 The Lonely One - 03:51
 The Great Escape - 04:01
 Was It Love - 04:04
 I Always Will - 05:17
 Miss Politician - 03:40
 Don't You Let Go Of Me - 05:05
 Carry Hope - 04:19
 Waterfall - 03:51
 Far Away - 04:22
 I Love You - 03:52
 The Valley - 04:16
 When - 03:57
 But Beautiful - 03:19 (International bonus track)

Chart performance
The album debuted at #1 in the Netherlands and stayed there for 7 weeks in a row. The Great Escape has never left the top 20 since its release and spent 16 weeks in the top 10 and 37 weeks in the top 20. The album was certified Platinum in August and double Platinum in December 2006.

Albums

Singles

References

External links
 Official website
 Official Myspace

2006 albums
Ilse DeLange albums
Universal Music Netherlands albums